Shivajirao Patil Nilangekar (9 February  1931 – 5 August 2020) was a leader of Indian National Congress party who served as chief minister of Maharashtra.

He was chief minister from June 1985 to March 1986. His rule was the briefest of all chief ministers (apart from caretaker chief minister P K Sawant). He resigned after the Bombay High Court passed strictures against him  regarding fraud in the MD examinations  to help his daughter and her friend.

His daughter-in-law, Rupatai Patil Nilangekar, represented Latur (Lok Sabha constituency) for BJP from 2004 to 2009.

Educational activities
Nilangekar established the Maharashtra Education Trust in 1968. Under the aegis of his education society around four senior colleges, twelve higher secondary schools and fifteen primary schools were established. Maharashtra Pharmacy College, Nilanga, was established in 1984. The Maharashtra Poly. (D.Pharmacy) Institute, Nilanga which was government aided, started in 1981 and was followed by the Maharashtra College of Engineering in 1983. His interests included reading, classical music, volleyball and table tennis. He was born in Nilanga, his home town.

Death 
Shivajirao died on 5 August 2020, at the age of 89 due to COVID-19 related complications during the COVID-19 pandemic in India.

References

External links
 Maharashtra College of Engineering Nilanga

Chief Ministers of Maharashtra
1931 births
2020 deaths
People from Maharashtra
Indian National Congress politicians
Maharashtra MLAs 1985–1990
People from Latur district
Chief ministers from Indian National Congress
People from Marathwada
Marathi politicians
Bharatiya Janata Party politicians from Maharashtra
Deaths from the COVID-19 pandemic in India
Indian National Congress politicians from Maharashtra